Marcus Roberts is a British actor from London, England. He has appeared in numerous TV shows and films in England and is recently gaining recognition in America. He was the main star of the TV Movie The OAP Killer: First Kill, Last Kill that aired on Channel 5 TV.
He was interviewed in The Telegraph newspaper about taking on such a harrowing role.
He is on the social celebrity magazine WhoSay.
He is also in the top five percent of social media users according to Klear.

References

British male television actors
Year of birth missing (living people)
Male actors from London
Place of birth missing (living people)
Living people